The Temple of ECK, located near Lake Ann in Chanhassen, Minnesota on about  of land, is the center of the Eckankar faith in the United States. Purchased by the church in 1985,It was built at a cost of $8.2 million. The building was completed in 1990.

References

Religious buildings and structures in Minnesota
Religious buildings and structures completed in 1990
1990 establishments in Minnesota
Chanhassen, Minnesota